Nigar Aydin qizi Jamal (born 7 September 1980), sometimes known as Nikki Jamal, is an English-Azerbaijani singer. Born and raised in Baku, she has resided in London since 2005. She won the Eurovision Song Contest 2011 with Eldar Gasimov with the song "Running Scared". She and Gasimov have since performed as a duo on various occasions under the name Ell & Nikki.

Early life
Jamal was born as Nigar Mutallibzadeh in Baku on 7 September 1980. In 1997, she entered Khazar University, majoring in economics and management, finishing 3 out of 4 years. Before trying herself as a singer, Nigar Jamal had been a housewife for five years. Jamal says she is inspired by the likes of Christina Aguilera, Alicia Keys, Brandy Norwood, Craig David and Chris Brown.

Career

Eurovision Song Contest 2011

In December 2010, Jamal took part in the Azerbaijani national selection, Milli Seçim Turu 2011. Her first appearance was in Heat 7, placing joint first with 11 points, along with Ilhama Gasimova, both qualifying to the semi-final. Jamal qualified from the semi-final along with four other artists to the final on 11 February 2011, where she and Eldar Gasimov won the right to represent Azerbaijan at the Eurovision Song Contest 2011 in Düsseldorf, Germany in May 2011. They sang under the pseudonym Ell & Nikki the song "Running Scared" written by Stefan Örn and Sandra Bjurman from Sweden and Iain Farquharson from the UK, which won with a total of 221 points.

2011–present: After Eurovision
After winning the Eurovision Song Contest 2011 Jamal and Gasimov got to travel to a number of countries and perform their winning entry.  In Azerbaijan 15,000 postage stamps in the denomination of 1 Azerbaijani manat were printed. The production of postage stamps in Azerbaijan were in dedication of Eldar and Nigar's victory at the 2011 contest.  In September 2011 it was announced that Nigar would appear in an episode of the Turkish comedy series Yahşi Cazibe.

In 2012, she was among five musicians from Azerbaijan chosen as the jury in the Danish national selection for their 2012 Eurovision contestant.

On 1 December 2011 Nikki presented her first post-Eurovision solo song and video clip "Crush on You".  Other new material was released afterwards, including a duet with Miri Yusif entitled "Qal" ("Stay"); and another duet with Eurovision 2008 winner Dima Bilan entitled "Come Into My World".

On 11 August 2012, she released her debut album entitled "Play With Me". She has reportedly worked with Danish songwriter Boe Larsen for the album.

In early 2014, she was a judge in the Turkish television show X Factor and produced the winner of the show.

Discography

Albums

 2014: Play With Me

Singles

See also
British Azerbaijanis
Azerbaijani ballet
Azerbaijani pop music
Azerbaijani jazz

References

External links

1980 births
Living people
Eurovision Song Contest entrants for Azerbaijan
21st-century Azerbaijani women singers
Eurovision Song Contest entrants of 2011
Azerbaijani emigrants to England
English-language singers from Azerbaijan
Khazar University alumni
Musicians from Baku